The Kelantan order of precedence is a nominal and symbolic hierarchy of important positions within the state of Kelantan. It has no legal standing but is used to dictate ceremonial protocol at events of a state nature.

Order of precedence 

Order of precedence in Kelantan is as follows:

See also 
 List of post-nominal letters (Kelantan)

References 

Orders of precedence in Malaysia
Government of Kelantan